A partial solar eclipse will occur on July 12, 2094. A solar eclipse occurs when the Moon passes between Earth and the Sun, thereby totally or partly obscuring the image of the Sun for a viewer on Earth. A partial solar eclipse occurs in the polar regions of the Earth when the center of the Moon's shadow misses the Earth.

Related eclipses

Solar eclipses 2091–2094

Metonic series 
 All eclipses in this table occur at the Moon's ascending node.

References

External links 
 NASA graphics

2094 in science
2094 7 12
2094 7 12